Das Kleine Theater Essen  is a theatre in Essen, North Rhine-Westphalia, Germany.

Theatres in Essen
Buildings and structures in Essen